The year 1975 in science and technology involved some significant events, listed below.

Astronomy and space exploration
 April 19 –  Aryabhata, India's first satellite, is launched using Soviet boosters.
 July 17 – Apollo–Soyuz Test Project: An American Apollo and a Soviet Soyuz spacecraft dock with each other in orbit marking the first such link-up between spacecraft from the two nations.
 August 20 – Viking program: NASA launches the Viking 1 planetary probe toward Mars.

Biology
 August 7 – César Milstein and Georges Köhler report their discovery of how to use hybridoma cells to isolate monoclonal antibodies, effectively beginning the history of monoclonal antibody use in science.
 Living specimens of the Chacoan Peccary (Catagonus wagneri), previously known only from fossils, are identified in Paraguay.

Climatology
 August 8 – The term global warming is probably first used in its modern sense by Wallace Smith Broecker.

Computer science
 January – Altair 8800 is released, sparking the era of the microcomputer.
 March 5 – Hackers in Silicon Valley hold the first meeting of the Homebrew Computer Club.
 April 4 – Bill Gates and Paul Allen form a company at this time called Micro Soft in Albuquerque, New Mexico, to develop and sell BASIC interpreter software for the Altair 8800.
 The MOS Technology 6502 is introduced.  An 8-bit microprocessor that was designed by a small team led by Chuck Peddle for MOS Technology. It was, by a considerable margin, the least expensive full-featured microprocessor on the market.

Mathematics
 Benoit Mandelbrot coins the term fractal.
 The Harada–Norton group is discovered.
 John N. Mather and Richard McGehee prove that for the Newtonian collinear four-body problem there exist solutions which become unbounded in a finite time interval.
 The Monty Hall problem in probability is first posed, by Steve Selvin.

Medicine
 Lyme disease first recognised at Lyme, Connecticut.
 Mini–mental state examination (MMSE) or Folstein test introduced to screen for dementia or other cognitive dysfunction.

Technology
 Steven Sasson of Eastman Kodak in the United States produces the first self-contained (portable) digital camera.

Awards
 Nobel Prizes
 Physics – Aage Bohr, Ben Roy Mottelson, James Rainwater
 Chemistry – John Warcup Cornforth, Vladimir Prelog
 Medicine – David Baltimore, Renato Dulbecco, Howard Martin Temin
 Turing Award – Allen Newell, Herbert A. Simon

Births
 July 11 – Naomi McClure-Griffiths, American-born astrophysicist.
 July 17 – Terence Tao, Australian-born mathematician.
 November 14 – Martin Hairer, Swiss-born Austrian-British mathematician.
 Catherine A. Lozupone, American microbiologist.

Deaths
 February 14 – Sir Julian Huxley (b. 1887), English biologist and author.
 April 19 – Percy Lavon Julian (b. 1899), African American research chemist.
 May 14 – Ernst Alexanderson (b. 1878), Swedish American television pioneer.
 May 18 – Christopher Strachey (b. 1916), English computer scientist.
 June 8 – Douglas Guthrie (b. 1885), Scottish otolaryngologist and medical historian.
 June 27 – Sir Geoffrey Taylor (b. 1886), English physicist.
 September 5 – Alice Catherine Evans (b. 1881), American microbiologist.
 October 10 – August Dvorak (b. 1894), American educational psychologist.
 October 23 – Gordon Hamilton Fairley (b. 1930), British oncologist.
 November – Priscilla Fairfield Bok (b. 1896), American astronomer.
 December 13 – Mary Locke Petermann (b. 1908), American cellular biochemist.
 December 28 – Frances McConnell-Mills (b. 1900), American toxicologist.

References

 
20th century in science
1970s in science